Geissanthus is a genus of shrubs and trees in the family Primulaceae. There are 51 species distributed in South America, with 25 of them in forests of the Andes.

Species include:

 Geissanthus challuayacus Pipoly
 Geissanthus ecuadorensis Mez
 Geissanthus fallenae Lundell
 Geissanthus pichinchae Mez
 Geissanthus pinchinchana (Lundell) Pipoly
 Geissanthus spectabilis Pipoly
 Geissanthus vanderwerffii Pipoly

References

 
Primulaceae genera
Taxonomy articles created by Polbot
Taxa named by Joseph Dalton Hooker